Alexander Nikolaevich Bashlachev (27 May 1960 – 17 February 1988) was a Soviet poet, singer-songwriter and guitarist, a performer in Russian rock music, included in the 27 Club.

Early life 
Bashlachev was born in Cherepovets, Soviet Union, the son of Nikolai Bashlachev and Nellie Bashlacheva. In 1977, Bashlachev graduated from Cherepovets High School in Cherepovets, and worked as a painter at the Cherepovets Metallurgical Plant with his father. In 1978, he resigned from the plant to enroll at the Ural State University in Yekaterinburg (then called Sverdlovsk) as a journalism major. Bashlachev graduated in 1983.

Career 
In early 1983, Bashlachev wrote "Griboyedov Waltz", which was the first song he had written. Throughout the 1980s, Bashlachev wrote and composed music. After he graduated at the Ural State University, Bashlachev left Sverdlovsk and returned to Cherepovets, where he worked for a year with the newspaper The Communist. There, he wrote articles about the power plant, and, later, about cafés.

In May 1984, Bashlachev attended the Leningrad Rock Festival in Leningrad. There, he bought an acoustic guitar which he had taught himself to play. In September, he played some of his songs at his friend Leonid Parfyonov's apartment in Leningrad. Over the years, he would play several flat concerts. It is worth noting that rock music was censored in Russia during the 1970s and the 1980s. To get around this, musicians played for small audiences at their homes or at the homes of their friends. These gatherings were called "kvartirniks". In October, Bashlachev met music journalist Artemy Troitsky, who invited Bashlachev to Moscow to write and compose music. In December 1984, Bashlachev settled in Leningrad.

In March 1985, Bashlachev along with Yuri Shevchuk played at the Leningrad Rock Festival. The two performed before an audience of six hundred concertgoers at the Leningrad Veterinary Institute in Leningrad. A recording of this concert was released under the title of "Kochegarka". Officially a worker at a coal boiler station, popularly known as Kamchatka (it also served as an underground rock venue), Bashlachev became a member of the Leningrad Rock Club. In June 1987 he performed at the Leningrad Rock Festival for the second and final time, and was awarded there Nadezhda (Hope) prize.

Death 

Shortly before his death, Bashlachev had difficulties with writer's block, rarely writing new songs and tending to avoid performing old ones. His last song, entitled "Cherry", was written in August 1987. He also became more isolated as his depression grew more severe.

On 17 February 1988, Bashlachev died after falling from the window of the ninth floor of an apartment on Kuznetsov Avenue in Leningrad. The most likely cause of his death, though unverified, was suicide. He was buried at the Kovalevskoye Cemetery in the Leningrad Oblast. Bashlachev's son, Yegor, was born to his girlfriend Anastasia Rakhlina a few months after his death.

Discography 

 Time of Bells (1989) – recorded in January 1986 during the second of two single-day sessions at the apartment of the administrator at the Moscow Rock Laboratory, Alexander Ageev. Bashlachev sang 24 songs.
 Everything Will Be Fine (1990) – recorded in January 1986 during the first of two sessions. Bashlachev sang 24 songs.
 Taganka (1992) – recorded by Andrei Zachesov on 22 January 1986, in Taganka.
 Eternal Fasting (1994) – recorded in May 1986 in the studio of Alexander Lipnitsky.
 Famously (1994) – recorded on 20 January 1986, in the home studio of Alexander Ageev (Moscow).
 VII (1994) — recorded by Oleg Kovriga at a concert at the home of Egor Egorov in Moscow on 14 January 1988, and at a home concert at the home of Marina Timasheva in Moscow on 29 January 1988. Entry is also known as "Last Concert".
 II (1996) — Recorded at the home of Marina Terganova and Alexander Nesmelov in Moscow on 14 April 1985.
 IV (1996) — Recorded by Oleg Zamovsky at his home in Vladimir in June 1986, Tatiana Nilova and Yuri Morozov in the studio of Radio House in Leningrad for the documentary, Petr Soldatenkov's studio in June 1987 and Igor Vasiliev's home in Alexander Ageev of Moscow on 20 January 1986.
 Kochegarka (1997) – underground concert with Yuri Shevchuk in Leningrad. Recorded on 18 March 1985.
 Moscow (1998) – recorded by Artemy Troitsky in Moscow on 20 October 1984, at the apartment of Sergei Ryzhenko.
 I (1998) – recorded at Viktor Alisov and Igor Vasiliev's home studio in Moscow on 17 to 19 September 1984, at a home concert at Cherepovets in the summer of 1984 and by Sergey Firsov at his home in Leningrad in September 1985.
 IV (1998) — recorded by Oleg at a concert at the home of Egor Egorov in Moscow on 4 October 1985.
 V (1998) — recorded by Igor Vasilyev at the house of Alexander Ageev in Moscow 20 January 1986, and by Mark Kopelev at a concert in Novosibirsk of Leningrad in December 1985 and July 1986.
 Chernobyl Loners at the Edge of the World (1999) – recording made by Sergei Firsov 15 August 1986, on household equipment. Personnel: Alexander Bashlachev – vocals, lead guitar; Andrew Shatalin – bass guitar; Pavel Kondratenko – piano, and Sviatoslav Zaderiy – percussion.
 VI (2002) — 1, 2, 7 – recorded by Oleg at a concert in Moscow in October 1986. 3–6 – recorded by Boris Pereverzev at a home concert at Artemy Troitsky's apartment in Moscow on 15 January 1986. 8—11 — recorded by Oleg at the home of Egor Egorov in Moscow on 14 January 1988. 12, 13 — recorded by Kirill Kuvyrdin at his home in Moscow on 5 July 1987. 14 — recorded at the Mitki exhibition in Leningrad in July 1987; harmonica – Boris Grebenshchikov. 15–20 – recorded by Sergei Firsov at his home in Leningrad on 22 August 1986.

References

External links 

 Alexander Bashlachev
 Alexander Bashlachev (Some of his poems in English translation)

1960 births
1988 deaths
People from Cherepovets
Russian male poets
Russian rock guitarists
Russian male guitarists
Russian rock singers
Soviet poets
Soviet male writers
20th-century Russian male writers
Suicides in the Soviet Union
20th-century Russian singers
20th-century guitarists
20th-century Russian male singers
Ural State University alumni
Suicides by jumping in Russia
1988 suicides